Zhang Yongqiang (born 19 March 1985) is a Chinese rower. He competed in the men's eight event at the 2008 Summer Olympics.

References

1985 births
Living people
Chinese male rowers
Olympic rowers of China
Rowers at the 2008 Summer Olympics
Rowers from Shandong